Mimoclystia is a genus of moths in the family Geometridae described by Warren in 1901.

Type species: Mimoclystia undulosata Warren, 1901

Species
Some species of this genus are:

Mimoclystia acme (Prout, 1922)
Mimoclystia andringitra Herbulot, 1963
Mimoclystia bambusarum Herbulot, 1988
Mimoclystia bergeri (Gaede, 1915)
Mimoclystia cancellata (Warren, 1899)
Mimoclystia corticearia (Aurivillius, 1910)
Mimoclystia deplanata (de Joannis, 1913)
Mimoclystia dimorpha Herbulot, 1966
Mimoclystia eucesta D. S. Fletcher, 1958
Mimoclystia euthygramma (Prout, 1921)
Mimoclystia explanata (Walker, 1862)
Mimoclystia griveaudi Herbulot, 1970
Mimoclystia lichenarum Herbulot, 1963
Mimoclystia limonias (Prout, 1933)
Mimoclystia mermera (Prout, 1935)
Mimoclystia mimetica (Debauche, 1938)
Mimoclystia pudicata (Walker, 1862)
Mimoclystia rhodopnoa (Prout, 1928)
Mimoclystia tepescens Prout, 1922
Mimoclystia thermochroa (Hampson, 1909)
Mimoclystia thorenaria (Swinhoe, 1904)
Mimoclystia toxeres D. S. Fletcher, 1978
Mimoclystia undulosata Warren, 1901

References

Geometridae